Lake Shawnee may refer to:

 Lake Shawnee (New Jersey), a lake in Jefferson Township, New Jersey
 Lake Shawnee, West Virginia, an unincorporated community
 Lake Shawnee Amusement Park, a defunct amusement park in Princeton, West Virginia
 Shawnee State Park (Pennsylvania), in Bedford County, Pennsylvania, containing Shawnee Lake

See also
 Shawnee State Fishing Lake, Topeka, Kansas